The Armagh Observer was a regional newspaper covering the County Armagh area of Northern Ireland. It was owned by Observer Newspapers (N.I.) Ltd.

It was first published in 1930.

The Armagh Observer ceased publication in April 2017.

References

Newspapers published in Northern Ireland
Mass media in County Armagh